Edward Neville, de facto 3rd (de jure 1st) Baron Bergavenny (died 18 October 1476) was an English nobleman.

Family
He was the 7th son of Ralph Neville, 1st Earl of Westmorland, and Joan Beaufort, daughter of John of Gaunt and Katherine Swynford).

In 1436 he married Elizabeth de Beauchamp (died 18 June 1448), daughter of Richard de Beauchamp, 1st Earl of Worcester, and the former Isabel le Despenser, who later succeeded as de jure 3rd Baroness Bergavenny. They had four children:
 Richard Nevill (before 1439 – before 1476), eldest son and heir apparent, predeceased his father;
 George Nevill, 4th Baron Bergavenny (–1492), 2nd and eldest surviving son and heir;
 Alice Nevill, who married Sir Thomas Grey;
 Catherine Nevill (born ), who married John Iwardby.

Shortly after his first wife's death, in the summer or autumn of 1448, he married Katherine Howard, a daughter of Sir Robert Howard and sister of John Howard, 1st Duke of Norfolk. His second wife bore him three additional daughters:
 Catherine Nevill (b. c. 1452/bef. 1473) married Robert Tanfield (b. 1461), son of Robert Tanfield and Elizabeth Brooke, daughter of Edward Brooke, 6th Baron Cobham, and Elizabeth Touchet, born c. 1433, and had children.
 Margaret Nevill (b.bef. 1476–1506), who married John Brooke, 7th Baron Cobham; John and Margaret are the grandparents of Elizabeth Brooke, Lady Wyatt;
 Anne Nevill (b.bef 1476-1480/81) did not long survive her father.

Career
Neville was knighted sometime after 1426.

In 1438, Bergavenny, as he was now styled, was a justice of the peace for Durham.

He was a captain in the embattled Duchy of Normandy in 1449. His eldest son Richard was one of the hostages given to the French when the English surrendered the city of Rouen in that year.

After the death of his first wife, he was summoned to Parliament in 1450 as "Edwardo Nevyll de Bergavenny", by which he is held to have become Baron Bergavenny. At the time, however, this was considered to be a summons by right of his wife, and so he was considered the 3rd, rather than the 1st, Baron.

In 1454, he was appointed to the Privy Council assembled by the Duke of York as Lord Protector, along with his more prominent Neville kinsmen. He was a commissioner of array in Kent in 1461, and was a captain in Edward IV's army in the North the following year. He was again a commissioner of array in 1470, remaining loyal to Edward IV, unlike his nephew, the Earl of Warwick

Ancestry

References

External links
thepeerage.com page

15th-century births
1476 deaths
Peers jure uxoris
Nevill, Edward
Edward
Barons Bergavenny (Peerage of England)